James Jolly (16 June 1872 – 24 December 1947) was an  Australian rules footballer who played with South Melbourne in the Victorian Football League (VFL).

Notes

External links 

1872 births
1947 deaths
Australian rules footballers from Victoria (Australia)
Sydney Swans players
People from Clunes, Victoria